Co-op News is a UK-based monthly news magazine and website for the global co-operative movement.

First published in Manchester in 1871 as The Co-operative News, the paper is the world's oldest co-operative newspaper. Originally a weekly newspaper, the paper moved to being published fortnightly in 2006, and finally monthly in 2017. Recent years have also seen the newspaper re-brand and move to its current news magazine format.

The paper is based in Holyoake House, Manchester and is published by the Co-operative Press, a consumer co-operative whose members are the subscribers of the paper.

In 1883 the paper began publishing a Women's Corner, edited by Alice Acland. This fomented the establishment of the Women's League for the Spread of Co-operation later that year. The League was later renamed to the Women's Co-operative Guild.

In 1971 the Scottish Co-operator – founded 1893 – was merged into the Co-operative News.

See also
 Co-operative Press

References

External links
 Official website

Biweekly magazines published in the United Kingdom
British news websites
Business magazines published in the United Kingdom
Magazines established in 1871
Magazines published in Manchester
Monthly magazines published in the United Kingdom
News magazines published in the United Kingdom
Weekly magazines published in the United Kingdom
Cooperative movement
Co-operatives in the United Kingdom